Leptomyrina gorgias, the common black-eye, is a butterfly of the family Lycaenidae. It is found in southern Africa.

The wingspan is 18.5–29 mm for males and 25–32 mm for females. Adults are on wing, year round, with peaks in November and March.

The larvae feed on Kalanchoe, Crassula and Cotyledon species.

Subspecies
Leptomyrina gorgias gorgias (East Cape, KwaZulu-Natal, Transvaal, Orange Free State, southern Mozambique)
Leptomyrina gorgias sobrina Talbot, 1935 (Somalia, eastern Kenya, Tanzania, northern Mozambique, Zambia)
Leptomyrina gorgias cana Talbot, 1935 (western Kenya, Uganda)

References

Butterflies described in 1790
Hypolycaenini
Lepidoptera of Southern Africa
Lepidoptera of Tanzania
Lepidoptera of Kenya
Lepidoptera of Uganda
Insects of Somalia